Conus sogodensis is a species of sea snail, a marine gastropod mollusc in the family Conidae, the cone snails, cone shells or cones.

These snails are predatory and venomous. They are capable of "stinging" humans.

Description
The size of the shell varies between 44 mm and 62 mm.

Distribution
This marine species occurs off the Philippines.

References

 Poppe, G. T., Monnier, E., Tagaro, S. P. (2012), New Conidae from the Central Philippines. - Visaya vol. 3(5) 
 Puillandre N., Duda T.F., Meyer C., Olivera B.M. & Bouchet P. (2015). One, four or 100 genera? A new classification of the cone snails. Journal of Molluscan Studies. 81: 1-23

External links
 To World Register of Marine Species
 Gastropods.com: Graphiconus laterculatus var. sogodensis

sogodensis
Gastropods described in 2012